Nycteola poliophaea is a moth of the family Nolidae first described by George Hampson in 1907. It is found in Sri Lanka and India.

Description
Its forewings are pale gray with zigzag, antemedial and postmedial fasciae. There is a dark tooth visible from the sub-basal which extends to the antemedial. Its larval food plant is Eugenia.

References

Moths of Asia
Moths described in 1907
Nolidae